European route E 840 is a European B-class road in Italy, connecting the cities Sassari in Sardinia to Tarquinia in mainland Italy where it connects to E80.

Route 
 
 E25 Sassari
 Olbia
 gap across the Tyrrhenian Sea
 Civitavecchia
 E80 Tarquinia

External links 
 UN Economic Commission for Europe: Overall Map of E-road Network (2007)

International E-road network
Roads in Italy